The Bulgarian Union of Banat–Romania (UBB-R; , BSB-R) is an ethnic minority political party in Romania representing the Bulgarian community.

History
The UBB-R contested the 1990 general elections, and despite receiving only 3,451 votes (0.03%), it won a single seat in the Chamber of Deputies under the electoral law that allows for political parties representing ethnic minority groups to be exempt from the electoral threshold. It retained its seat in the 1992 elections, but was beaten by the Bratstvo Community of Bulgarians in Romania in the 1996 elections, losing its seat.

The party regained its seat in the 2000 elections, and has retained it in every election since.

Electoral history

References

External links
Official website

Non-registered political parties in Romania
Political parties of minorities in Romania